Dmitry Yeryomenko (born 29 November 1980) is a Kazakhstani cross-country skier. He competed in the men's 15 kilometre classical event at the 2006 Winter Olympics.

References

External links
 

1980 births
Living people
Kazakhstani male cross-country skiers
Olympic cross-country skiers of Kazakhstan
Cross-country skiers at the 2006 Winter Olympics
People from Akmola Region
Asian Games medalists in cross-country skiing
Cross-country skiers at the 2003 Asian Winter Games
Medalists at the 2003 Asian Winter Games
Asian Games bronze medalists for Kazakhstan
Asian Games silver medalists for Kazakhstan
21st-century Kazakhstani people